"The Love Parade" is the fourth single released by The Dream Academy. It was a more "edgy" song than their previous singles, made so by the inclusion of implied themes of adultery and erotic temptation in the lyrics., and was arranged to a brisk bossa nova-esque beat which was in stark contrast to the style of the group's first single Life In A Northern Town . There were two additional singles released in the UK by Blanco y Negro, a 7" shaped picture disc and a second limited edition release.

Background
The Love Parade is the only song on The Dream Academy's eponymous album not to be produced by David Gilmour. Instead, the band recruited Alan Tarney to work with them on the track. Tarney was brought in at the suggestion of Rough Trade Records founder Geoff Travis to work on "The Love Parade". "What happened was, we had a pretty good demo for “Love Parade,” and we loved it, and when we made the record with David, somehow we never got 'round to it". Lead vocalist Nick Laird-Clowes noted that Tarney brought some "real special techniques" to the table: he tracked the vocals "12 or 15 times" during certain portions of the song.

There were high hopes for the single, especially from Warner, and there was some degree of promotion of the song (such as a live performance on American Bandstand). However, the single failed to live up to the expectations of their debut single, "Life in a Northern Town", just making the top 40 (#36) in the US and reaching #68 in the UK.

Track listing
7" version
"The Love Parade" - 3:50
"Girl in a Million" (for Edie Sedgwick) - 3:50

Chart performance

References

External links
The Video. Hosted on VH1.com.

1986 singles
The Dream Academy songs
1985 songs
Songs written by Nick Laird-Clowes
Blanco y Negro Records singles
Reprise Records singles
Song recordings produced by Alan Tarney